Cacicedo is a village of the municipality of Camargo, Cantabria, Spain. The population in the year 2012 was 1.000 inhabitants.

References

Populated places in Cantabria